The California Tort Claims Act  is the act that governs filing claims against a government entity.  The Tort Claims Act is found in Division 3.6 of the Government Code, Govt. Code §§ 810 et seq.  Typically, one must first give written notice within 6 months of the injury or discovery of the injury before filing an actual lawsuit in a California superior court, giving the governmental agency time to settle the claim.

See also
American Motorcycle Ass'n v. Superior Court, Supreme Court of California case for apportionment of liability among multiple tortfeasors for negligence

References

California statutes